The World Group Play-offs were four ties which involved the losing nations of the World Group first round and the winning nations of the World Group II. Nations that won their play-off ties entered the 2007 World Group, while losing nations joined the 2007 World Group II.

Japan vs. Austria

France vs. Czech Republic

China vs. Germany

Croatia vs. Russia

References

See also
Fed Cup structure

World Group Play-offs